Oscar Garin (born 17 September 1900, date of death unknown) was a Swiss long-distance runner. He competed in the men's 10,000 metres at the 1920 Summer Olympics.

References

External links
 

1900 births
Year of death missing
Athletes (track and field) at the 1920 Summer Olympics
Swiss male long-distance runners
Olympic athletes of Switzerland
Place of birth missing